Emmanuel Benjamin (born 9 September 1979), known professionally as Eben is a Nigerian gospel singer, vocalist, and songwriter.

Early life and education 
Eben was born and raised in Lagos, Nigeria, the fifth of six children. He is from a Christian family and attended Orile Primary School, and Community Grammar School, Orile, Lagos.

Career 
In 1997, Eben started his singing career and was mentored by his elder brother as a rapper but he later discovered his talent in singing and became a gospel singer. In 2005, as a gospel singer, Eben became popular after his first big public appearance, at a youth conference organized by Pastor Chris where "Imarama" was first heard.

In 2006, Eben was a member of Christ Embassy founded by Pastor Chris Oyakhilome. In 2007, Eben released his first album, "On the Rock", which includes songs like “Imaranma”, ”God Dey”, ”Iwo Nikan”, "I Don Hammer", and other tracks.
In 2010, he released a follow-up album, “Phenomenon”, which included songs like "Supper Man", "Imele Papa", "Siya Nma" and several other tracks.
In 2013, Eben released another album titled “Justified”, which included songs like “You Alone Are Worthy”, "Onye Nwem", "How I Love You", "For Ever" and "All The Way".
Eben also has a record label called Hammer House of Rock, with a business arm called the Hammer House Ventures, which specializes in video and music production, event management and interior decoration. And also another album titled "Magnified", with songs like “Stayed On You”, "Everything", "Idi Nma", "Lifted Hands" and other worship songs.
Eben went viral after he released a song titled “Victory”.

On 15 September 2019, Eben host a life concert called Joyful Noise 2019 which featured top gospel musicians and also popular American musicians Bob Fitts and Phil Thompson.

Discography

Studio albums 
 On the Rock (2007)
 Phenomenon (2010)
 Justified (2013)
 Victory (2017)
 Magnified

Awards and nominations 
 In 2012, he won the PBO Musical Video Awards
 ‘Best Male Artiste’ Africa gospel Music Awards UK
 Best Male Artiste at the National Gospel Awards Nigeria
 Best Gospel Video Award at the Nigerian Music Awards
 Best Gospel Video ‘NMVA’
 In the year 2013, he won the Best West Africa award at the Africa Gospel Music Awards
 in 2014, he won the Album of the Year at the Crystal Awards
Male Vocalist of the year at the LIMA AWARDS (2020)
 Songwriter of the Year at the LIMA AWARDS (2020)

Personal life 
On 30 November 2013, Eben married Jahdiel (Grace Okoduwa), his fellow gospel singer, with whom he has two children. In December 2013, Eben and Jahdiel had a white wedding and was joined in holy matrimony by Pastor Chris Oyakhilome of Christ Embassy. They are blessed with 2 children.

References 

Living people
Nigerian male singer-songwriters
Nigerian singer-songwriters
Nigerian gospel singers
People from Lagos State by occupation
1979 births